Normal is an unincorporated community in Grant County, Indiana, in the United States.

History
The first post office opened at Normal, in 1852, was called Slash. The post office was renamed Normal in 1880, and remained in operation until it was discontinued in 1902.

References

Unincorporated communities in Grant County, Indiana
Unincorporated communities in Indiana